Pauline Christina Bryan, Baroness Bryan of Partick {born 3 January 1950) is a Scottish writer and socialist campaigner. She was nominated for a life peerage by the Leader of the Labour Party, Jeremy Corbyn, in May 2018. On 20 June, she was created Baroness Bryan of Partick, of Partick in the City of Glasgow.

Bryan is part of the Red Paper Collective, a group of Labour activists who aim to provide an alternative from the perspective of the Labour movement to the "sterile nationalist v unionist debate" around the Scottish independence referendums. Bryan reviewed Neil Findlay's book about his bid for the leadership of the Scottish Labour Party, Socialism & Hope: A journey through turbulent times, for the Morning Star in 2017. In her review Bryan wrote that the election of Jeremy Corbyn as leader of the Labour Party "was a lifeline for the left. It rebuilt friendships and enthusiasm. ...By the 2017 election, we saw the beginnings of a renewed Scottish Labour Party and a renewed activist base who, regardless of what their MPs and MSPs thought, were committing themselves to a radical Labour Party".

Bryan is a founding member of the Keir Hardie Society, and was the editor of the 2015 book What Would Keir Hardie Say?. She is also a founding member of the Campaign for Socialism.

References

External links

Articles authored by Bryan at the Red Paper Collective

Living people
Labour Party (UK) life peers
Life peeresses created by Elizabeth II
Members of the Fabian Society
Scottish Labour
Scottish socialists
Scottish political commentators
Scottish political writers
Scottish women in politics
1950 births